The Kawasaki Heavy Industries & Nippon Sharyo C751B is the third generation electric multiple unit rolling stock in operation on the North–South and East–West lines of Singapore's Mass Rapid Transit (MRT) system since early 2000, manufactured by Kawasaki Heavy Industries & Nippon Sharyo (KNS) under Contract 751B. 21 trainsets of 6 cars each were purchased at S$231 million, and it is the first rolling stock to feature VVVF insulated-gate bipolar transistor traction control system. Kawasaki manufactured 66 cars and Nippon Sharyo manufactured 60 cars respectively with no comparable differences, having built to agreed specifications. These trains are the third generation of rolling stock to be used on the two lines.

Exterior design 
The front of the train spots a more slanted and streamlined look, with the run number display in Orange LED Displays. The C751B train is the first train to have the updated SMRT "Blackbird" livery.

These trains were fitted with Mobitec MobiLED electronic destination displays for train run numbers. The C751B was also the first MRT train type to feature anti-climbers, which help prevent overriding of the train cab in the event of a collision that could cause a catastrophic failure. They also feature rubber guards to prevent people from falling between cars: this feature was also used on the C151A. However, the rubber guards are now redundant with the introduction of platform screen doors on elevated stations. The C151A, C151B and C151C trainsets manufactured by Kawasaki Heavy Industries & CRRC Qingdao Sifang are also developed from the Kawasaki–Nippon Sharyo C751B.

Interior design 
All cars have been retrofitted with 6 LCD Displays per car and all except trainset 347/348 which features VPIS (Visual Passenger Information System) displays from July 2001 to September 2009. These used to show rail travel information, commercials and movie trailers. The C751B is also the first train to have wheelchair space, with the retrofitting of the elevators in the MRT stations began in 2000. The interior design was also improved; the seats were now 48 cm wide - about 5 cm wider than on previous train types. The STARIS version 2.0 was piloted on train car 3322 in 2010, but it was uninstalled in 2016 as it was not compatible with the updated STARIS displays for C151B and C151C trains.

The LCD Displays were deactivated since July 2007 and LED Displays was not used since January 2008 with the change of voice announcer. All VPIS were removed to make way for the STARIS by 2010. In 2013, support bars are added to the seats with hand grips, and the middle handrails with hand grips are configured to join across nearly one car, as such all triplicates stanchion poles are replaced by regular single grabpoles.

The colour of the seats on each car of these trains are also different from their earlier counterparts - turquoise for M1, cobalt blue for M2 and maroon for DT. All door panels and walls are white, which is a standard appearance of all SMRT trains. Energy efficient lighting was installed on 1328 and 3328 in 2017.

Equipment

Main Propulsion Controller/Motor
The C751B is the second commuter type Electric Multiple Unit (EMU) after the Sanyo 5030 series to feature electric systems fully manufactured by Fuji Electric. Propulsion is controlled by VVVF Inverter with 2-level IGBT semiconductor controller, rated at 415 kVA. Each inverter unit controls two motors on one bogie (1C2M), and one motor car features two of such units. Motors are three-phrase AC induction type, model MLR109, with a maximum output of 140 kW.

Bogies
The C751B uses the monolink axlebox type bolsterless air spring bogie. There are no major technical difference between a trailer and motor car bogie other than additional electrical components for the latter.

Auxiliary Systems
A break from tradition, the C751B features auxiliary inverters for its electrical systems on all six cars of the train. Previously, auxiliary inverters are mounted only on motor cars. The VVVF Inverter is controlled by IGBT semiconductors and rated at 80 kVA. A battery charger is built with the inverter and provides 16 kW output.

Operational history
The tender of the C751B trains was called to supplement the existing fleet with the opening of the Changi Airport extension. With the opening, it was delivered with luggage racks. These luggage racks were installed in every carriage of the train, taking up the space of two seats next to the door at the end of each carriage. The purpose of those racks were to let travellers heading to the airport, who usually carry a large amount of luggage, to have a space to place their bags easily. These trains are capable of being deployed on both the North–South and East–West Lines at all times. However, in practice, the C751B fleet usually operates exclusively on one line under normal operations. They were initially allocated on the Boon Lay to Changi Airport through train service from 10 January 2001 to 22 July 2003 with luggage racks installed. These luggage racks were underutilised, and travellers preferred to hold on to their bags when they were standing or sitting, probably due to convenience and fear of theft. Some commuters were also complaining that these racks took up critically needed space which could be occupied by other passengers which often filled the train.

On 13 April 2002, a fault was detected in a C751B train and it was subsequently withdrawn to Changi Depot for investigations. As the train was under warranty, the engineers from the manufacturers of the train and gearbox were flown in on 21 April. They subsequently detected metal fragments in the gearboxes, and those of another 20 trains. On 23 April 2002, SMRT immediately withdrew all 21 C751B trains and suspended the Boon Lay – Changi Airport train through service, replacing it with the Tanah Merah – Changi Airport shuttle service. Train frequencies were also adjusted until 6 May 2002, when 8 trains returned to service. Service resumed on 16 May 2002, with 7 more trains back on service. By end of May 2002, all C751B trains had been returned to service.

When the through train service to Changi Airport was converted into a shuttle service, the C751B fleet has been spread out across multiple lines from 2003 to 2008 and the luggage rack space were replaced by extra standing space, the C751B fleet has been spread around across multiple lines from 2003 to 2008; and moved nearly all of them to the North–South Line until 2019. Since 2 November 2019, nearly all of the C751B trains were reallocated to operate on the East–West Line with the opening of the Canberra station, as its existing STARiS Displays were not updated to include Canberra station in its STARIS route maps but only one or two trains were operated on the North–South Line rarely.

Retirement
In December 2019, Toyotron has been awarded the contract for disposal of old SMRT trains. On 14 March 2021, the first C751B train went for scrap and currently, only 4 of them are scrapped. With the termination of the Singapore Rail Engineering in September 2018 for refurbishment works after C651's project termination and the inability to refurbish STARIS maps in 2019, on 28 September 2020, the LTA announced that these trains will be replaced by R151 from Bombardier Transportation (Alstom) to progressively replace the 21 C751B trainsets together with the 19 C651 trainsets from 2024 onwards.

Train formation
The configuration of a C751B in revenue service is DT–M1–M2+M2–M1–DT

The car numbers of the trains range from x311 to x352, where x depends on the carriage type. Individual cars are assigned a 4 digit serial number by the rail operator SMRT Trains. A complete six-car trainset consists of an identical twin set of one driving trailer (DT) and two motor (M) cars permanently coupled together.

For example, set 345/346 consists of carriages 3345, 1345, 2345, 2346, 1346 and 3346.

 The first digit identifies the car number, where the trailer cars has a 3, the second and fifth cars has a 1 & the middle cars has a 2.
 The second digit is always a 3, part of the identification numbers
 The third digit and fourth digit are the train identification numbers. A full-length train of 6 cars have 2 different identification numbers. For example, 345/346 (normal coupling) or 345/352 (cross coupling).
 Kawasaki built sets 311/312, 315/316, 319/320, 323/324, 327/328 – 333/334, 343/344, 347/348 and 351/352.
 Nippon Sharyo co-built sets 313/314, 317/318, 321/322, 325/326, 335/336 – 341/342, 345/346 and 349/350.

As set numbers 301/302 was already being used by a money train (which was a Kawasaki Heavy Industries C151), the C751B trains were numbered starting from 311/312.

References

External links

Manufacturer's information on C751B, Kawasaki Heavy Industries
Manufacturer's information on C751B, Nippon Sharyo

Mass Rapid Transit (Singapore) rolling stock
Kawasaki multiple units
750 V DC multiple units
Train-related introductions in 2000
Nippon Sharyo multiple units